2751 Campbell, provisional designation , is a stony Nysian asteroid from the inner regions of the asteroid belt, approximately 6 kilometers in diameter.

It was discovered on 7 September 1962, by IU's Indiana Asteroid Program at Goethe Link Observatory near Brooklyn, Indiana, United States. It is named for American astronomer William Wallace Campbell.

Classification and orbit 

Campbell is a member of the stony subgroup of the Nysa family, a group of asteroids in the inner main-belt not far from the Kirkwood gap at 2.5 AU, a depleted zone where a 3:1 orbital resonance with the orbit of Jupiter exists. The Nysian group is named after its largest member 44 Nysa.

It orbits the Sun in the inner main-belt at a distance of 2.0–2.8 AU once every 3 years and 9 months (1,363 days). Its orbit has an eccentricity of 0.17 and an inclination of 1° with respect to the ecliptic. The body's observation arc begins with its official discovery observation, as no precoveries were taken, and no prior identifications were made.

Physical characteristics

Diameter and albedo 

According to the survey carried out by NASA's Wide-field Infrared Survey Explorer with its subsequent NEOWISE mission, Campbell measures 5.73 and 6.907 kilometers in diameter, and its surface has an albedo of 0.30 and 0.281, respectively, while the Collaborative Asteroid Lightcurve Link assumes a standard albedo for stony asteroids of 0.20 and calculates a larger diameter of 7.46 kilometers, with an absolute magnitude of 13.0. Campbell is an assumed S-type asteroid.

Rotation and shape 

In November 2007, a rotational lightcurve of Campbell was obtained from photometric observations by French amateur astronomer Pierre Antonini. Lightcurve analysis gave a rotation period of 2.747 hours with a brightness variation of 0.08 magnitude, which indicates, that the body has a nearly spheroidal shape.

Naming 

This minor planet was named in memory of American astronomer William Wallace Campbell (1862–1938), an observational spectroscopist and one of the first to measure the radial velocity of a large number of stars. In the 1920s and 1930s, Campbell was heading the U.S. National Academy of Sciences, the International Astronomical Union, and the University of California, and he was director of the Lick Observatory from 1901 to 1930. The lunar crater Campbell, as well as the Martian crater Campbell were named in his honor. The approved naming citation was published by the Minor Planet Center on 5 November 1987.

References

External links 
 Asteroid Lightcurve Database (LCDB), query form (info )
 Dictionary of Minor Planet Names, Google books
 Asteroids and comets rotation curves, CdR – Observatoire de Genève, Raoul Behrend
 Discovery Circumstances: Numbered Minor Planets (1)-(5000) – Minor Planet Center
 
 

002751
002751
Named minor planets
19620907